Jay Pather is a South African curator, choreographer, and director working in Cape Town.  He is the director of Siwela Sonke Dance Theatre and an associate professor at the University of Cape Town.  Pather has been involved in the choreography and direction of over one hundred productions in South Africa and even more internationally.

Education
  MA in Dance Theatre from New York University as a Fulbright Scholar in 1984
 Honours degrees in Literature and Drama from the University of Durban-Westville
 Performance Diploma from Trinity College London

Career
2012:
 Chairperson, National Arts Festival Artistic Committee
 Curator, Infecting the City
 Director, Gordon Institute for Performing and Creative Arts (GIPCA)
 Artistic director, Siwela Sonke Dance Theatre
 Associate Professor, University of Cape Town
2010:
 Curatorial team, Spier Contemporary
2007:
 Co-curator, Spier Contemporary
2004:
 World Social Forum, Mumbaai, India
 Its Festival, Amsterdam
 Festival of Dhow Countries, Zanzibar
 Personal Affects Exhibition, New York City, the Cathedral of St John the Divine and the Museum for African Art
 Resident Choreographer, Jazzart Dance Theatre
 Senior Lecturer, University of Zululand

References

External links
 Curator's Note, Infecting the City 2012: http://www.infectingthecity.com/2012/curators-note/ 
 ArtThrob Biography: http://www.artthrob.co.za/04dec/artbio.html

Year of birth missing (living people)
Tisch School of the Arts alumni
Living people
People from Durban
South African choreographers